O Pushpa I Hate Tears is a 2020 Indian Hindi-language comedy drama thriller film written and directed by Dinkar Kapoor. The film stars Krushna Abhishek, Anusmriti Sarkar , Arjumman Mughal and Karthik Jayaram in the lead roles. Kannada actor Karthik Jayaram made his Bollywood acting debut through this film. The film title was loosely inspired from a famous dialogue by the veteran actor Rajesh Khanna in the 1972 cult film Amar Prem. The film was initially scheduled for its theatrical release on 7 February 2020 but was later pushed to 28 February 2020 and was panned by critics.

Cast 
 Krushna Abhishek as Shyam
 Arjumman Mughal as Pushpa
 Karthik Jayaram as Aditya
 Anusmriti Sarkar as Teena
 Jimmy Moses as Lalu
 Pradeep Kabra as Kalu
 Anang Desai as Pushpa's father
 Akhilendra Mishra as Inspector Chaubley

Soundtrack 

The film's music was composed by with Ramji Gulati with lyrics written by Kunwar Juneja, Pahawa and Mack.

References

External links 
 

2020s Hindi-language films
2020 films
2020s comedy thriller films
2020 comedy-drama films
Indian comedy-drama films
Indian comedy thriller films